Sérgio Miguel Garcia Vieira (born 20 February 1976) is a Portuguese race walker. His twin brother, João Vieira, is also a race walker.

Achievements

References

External links

Profile at Olympic Committee of Portugal 

1976 births
Living people
People from Portimão
Portuguese male racewalkers
Portuguese twins
Athletes (track and field) at the 2008 Summer Olympics
Athletes (track and field) at the 2016 Summer Olympics
Olympic athletes of Portugal
Twin sportspeople
S.L. Benfica athletes
World Athletics Championships athletes for Portugal
Sportspeople from Faro District